Prior is a brand name used by Nortura on its eggs and white meat (mainly chicken, hen and turkey). The brand dates back to 1977 when Norsk Eggcentral rebranded Sol-egg to Prior. The brand was owned by Prior Norge until 2006 when it merged with Gilde Norsk Kjøtt to form Nortura.

External links
 Prior
 Nortura

Norwegian brands
Brand name poultry meats